Izzi may refer to:

 Izzi people, an ethnic group of Nigeria
 Izi language, an Igbo language of Nigeria
 Izzi (Ebonyi), a local government area in Ebonyi State, Nigeria
 Izzi Telecom, a Mexican telecommunications trademark
 Eugene Izzi (1953–1996), an American crime writer

See also 

 Izi (disambiguation)
 Izze (disambiguation)
 Izzi Top, a British Thoroughbred racehorse
 Izzy, a nickname

Language and nationality disambiguation pages